Lichenaula neboissi is a moth in the family Xyloryctidae. It was described by F.G. Neumann in 1970. It is found in Australia, where it has been recorded from Victoria.

The larvae feed on Pinus radiata.

References

Lichenaula
Moths described in 1970